Dirt track racing is a type of auto racing performed on oval tracks in South Africa. Dirt track racing classes are, as elsewhere, similar to those raced at the tar (asphalt) oval track racing venues. The dirt track classes include Hot Rods, 1600 Modified Saloons, Modified Non-contact Saloons, V8 American Saloons, and Midgets.

Venues

Eastern Province/Border

Free State/Northern Cape

KwaZulu-Natal

Northern Regions

Western Cape

External links
Port Elizabeth Ovaltrack Raceway
Victory Raceway Port Elizabeth
Rock Raceway Brakpan
Majuba Motorsport Volksrust
Monstermob Raceway Kimberley
Richards bay Hot rod club Oval Track
(http://www.lovematjienv848.co.za/ love matjien racing)

South Africa
Motorsport in South Africa
Lists of sports venues
South Africa sport-related lists